The Smart Forstars is a concept car produced by the Smart division of Daimler AG and unveiled at the 2012 Paris Motor Show. It also has an all-electric drivetrain, which is nearly identical to the one used in the Smart Brabus electric drive. It is based on the same architecture of the Smart For-Us concept that was introduced in the Detroit Motor Show in 2012.

References

Cars introduced in 2012
Concept cars
Electric cars
Smart vehicles